Rat na (literally: 'topping'), also written rad na, is a Thai-Chinese noodle dish. The name of the dish is pronounced  in Thai colloquial speech.

It is made with stir-fried wide rice noodles, a meat such as chicken, beef, pork, or seafood or tofu, garlic, straw mushrooms, and gai lan. The dish is then covered in a sauce made of stock and tapioca starch or cornstarch. It is seasoned with sweet soy sauce, fish sauce, sugar, and black pepper. In Thailand people often sprinkle some additional sugar, fish sauce, sliced chillies preserved in vinegar (with some of the vinegar), and ground dried chillies on the dish.

There are variants, including using rice vermicelli instead of the wide noodles, and using deep-fried thin egg noodles (mi krop), with the sauce poured on to soften them.

In areas where gai lan can not be easily obtained, broccoli and kale are often used as a substitute.

History 
Rat na was originally cooked in China, prepared only in high-end restaurants where it became very successful.  Teochew people (Chinese people native to the Chaoshan region) began cooking and selling it to working-class people and its popularity spread to Thailand.

Originally, rat na in Thailand was made with a little extra sauce and covered with a banana leaf. Diners themselves cut the fat noodles, which were large and circular, as they ate.

The notable rat na (including phat si-io) areas in Bangkok such as Tanao road in Phra Nakhon near Giant Swing and Bangkok City Hall, Wang Burapha near Thieves' Market and Saphan Lek, Sam Yan neighborhood in Pathum Wan, or Yaowarat neighborhood in Chinatown.

See also
Lard na - Lao version of a similar dish

References

Thai noodle dishes
Fried noodles